Clegg, known as The Bullet Machine in the USA, is a 1970 British crime film directed by Lindsay Shonteff and features Gilbert Wynne in his first starring role. The film follows a case of a private detective named Harry Clegg, a former policeman in London. The film was also released under the titles Clegg Private Eye, The Bullet Machine and Harry and the Hookers.

Gilbert Wynne would also star in Shonteff's next film, Permissive which was also released in 1970.

Cast
 Gilbert Wynne - Harry Clegg
 Norman Claridge - Lord Cruickshank
 Gilly Grant - Suzy the Slag
 Gary Hope - Wildman
 Ronald Leigh-Hunt - Inspector Kert
 Michael Nightingale - Col. Sullivan
 A. J. Brown - Joseph Valentine
 Noel Davis - Manager
 Margery Mason - Neighbour
 Sue Bond - Panties Girl

Production

Filming locations
The film was shot in various locations around London including the Docklands and Highgate Cemetery, as well as in Paris.

Music
The score was by Paul Ferris.

References

External links

1970 films
Films directed by Lindsay Shonteff
1970s action films
British crime drama films
Films set in London
1970s English-language films
1970s British films